BLR may refer to:

Base Lending Rate, in banking
Bad Lip Reading, a YouTube comedy channel
Bala Lake Railway, in North Wales
 Belarus, whose ISO 3166-1 alpha-3 code is BLR
 BLR, IATA code for Kempegowda International Airport in Bangalore, India
 Former IATA code for HAL Airport, the previous primary airport of Bangalore
Beta-lactam Ring Records, an independent record label
The Biggest Little Railway in the World, a 2017 temporary model railway in the Scottish Highlands
Blacklands Railroad, based in Texas

 blr, ISO 639-3 code for the Blang language of Burma and China
Breech-loading rifle
Browning BLR, a hunting rifle
Blacklight: Retribution, a first-person shooter game

See also
BLRC (disambiguation)
Burkitt lymphoma receptor 1 (BLR1), also known as CXCR5